John Gardiner (born 1810) was an English cricketer who was associated with Surrey and made his first-class cricket debut in 1828.

References

1810 births
Year of death unknown
English cricketers
English cricketers of 1826 to 1863
Surrey cricketers
People from Godalming